Langenstein Castle is a Renaissance building of the sixteenth century. Today it is owned by the Douglases, descendants of the Swedish count Ludvig Douglas. It is located within the territory of Orsingen-Nenzingen, a municipality in the Hegau region near lake Constance in southern Germany. The castle is widely known for its golf course. The palace also houses a Carnival Museum.

In 2014, count Axel Douglas sold the castle and all its lands to his cousin count Christoph Douglas, who died in 2016. His son count Leopold Douglas and his family live in the castle today.

References

External links
 Website of Langenstein Castle
 Website of the Carnival Museum

Museums in Baden-Württemberg
Golf in Germany